Ferdinando Riva (3 July 1930 – 15 August 2014) was a Swiss football forward who played for Switzerland in the 1954 FIFA World Cup. He also played for FC Mendrisio-Stabio and FC Chiasso.

References

External links
FIFA profile

1930 births
2014 deaths
Swiss men's footballers
Switzerland international footballers
Association football forwards
FC Chiasso players
1954 FIFA World Cup players
Swiss Super League players